Fjære is a former municipality in the old Aust-Agder county in Norway. The  municipality existed from 1846 until 1971. It was located to the north of the town of Grimstad. The name is still used to refer to that area, which is now a part of Grimstad municipality in Agder county. The administrative centre of Fjære was the village of Vik, just east of the historic Fjære Church. Other villages in Fjære included Fevik, Dømmesmoen, Frivold, Kroken, and Rønnes.

History

The municipality of Fjære was created in 1846 when the old municipality of Øyestad was divided. Initially, Fjære had a population of 2,806. The first municipal council met at a farmhouse at Bringsvær, north of Vik. In 1886, the council began meeting in the village of Vik. 

On 1 January 1878, a part of Fjære located adjacent to the town of Grimstad (population: 948) was transferred from Fjære to Grimstad. Again, on 1 January 1960, another part of Fjære located next to Grimstad (population: 344) was transferred from Fjære to the town of Grimstad.

On 1 January 1971, the neighboring municipalities of Fjære (population: 6,189) and Landvik (population: 2,781) were merged with the town of Grimstad (population: 2,794) to form a much larger municipality called Grimstad.

Name
The municipality (originally the parish) of Fjære was named after the old Fjære farm ( or ), where the first Fjære Church was built. The name is identical with the word  which means "fjord".

Government

The municipal council  of Fjære was made up of representatives that were elected to four year terms.  The party breakdown of the final municipal council was as follows:

Attractions

Fjære Church
Fjære Church is made of stone and dates back to the middle of the 12th century. Despite being 850 years old, it is an active parish church. It was not completed in one generation, but was created gradually over the centuries. The church grew together with the village and the people, and became the centre of Fjære's history from the Middle Ages until the present day. The oldest and most valuable individual cultural monuments in and around Fjære Church are the finely sculpted head of a man in stone over the south door, dating from before 1150.

The church's unique and beautiful baptismal font, in the High Gothic style from the Middle Ages. Olavskilden, a fountain associated with St. Olav the Holy. The Terje Vigen stone monument in memory of the brave men of the 1807–1814 war. The stone monument was erected in 1906 by the friends of Terje Vigen. The altarpiece, pulpit with paneled ceiling and pews with the names of farms painted on them are considered valuable. They were made during the period from 1500–1700.

See also
List of former municipalities of Norway

References

External links

Fjære school 

Grimstad
Former municipalities of Norway
1846 establishments in Norway
1971 disestablishments in Norway